Théo Delacroix (born 21 February 1999) is a French cyclist, who currently rides for UCI Continental team .

Major results
2017
 2nd La Classique des Alpes Juniors
2019
 1st  Road race, National Under–23 Road Championships
 9th Liège–Bastogne–Liège U23

References

External links

1999 births
Living people
French male cyclists